Bajadera is a Croatian layered nougat with almonds, hazelnuts or walnuts, invented and produced commercially by the Kraš confectionery company from Zagreb, Croatia.

References

External links 

 Kraš Bajadera

Croatian confectionery
Croatian brands